Jim Creighton (born April 18, 1950) is an American former professional basketball player.

A 6'8" forward, Creighton played at the University of Colorado from 1969 to 1972, scoring 1,032 points in his college career. He was selected by the Seattle SuperSonics with the 40th pick of the 1972 NBA Draft, but he did not reach the NBA until the 1975–76 season, when he played 32 games for the Atlanta Hawks. He scored 31 points in his only NBA season.

References

1950 births
Living people
American men's basketball players
Atlanta Hawks players
Basketball players from Montana
Colorado Buffaloes men's basketball players
Power forwards (basketball)
Seattle SuperSonics draft picks
Sportspeople from Billings, Montana